The Wagner Covered Bridge No. 19 is a historic wooden covered bridge, originally built in Locust Township in Columbia County, Pennsylvania. It originally crossed the North Branch of Roaring Creek. It is one of 28 historic covered bridges in Columbia and Montour Counties.

It was listed on the National Register of Historic Places in 1979. The bridge was dismantled on March 23, 1981, and the pieces stored at Knoebels Amusement Resort until it was rebuilt at the entrance to a housing development in Hemlock Township in 1994.

References 

Covered bridges on the National Register of Historic Places in Pennsylvania
Covered bridges in Columbia County, Pennsylvania
Bridges completed in 1856
Wooden bridges in Pennsylvania
Bridges in Columbia County, Pennsylvania
Relocated buildings and structures in Pennsylvania
National Register of Historic Places in Columbia County, Pennsylvania
Road bridges on the National Register of Historic Places in Pennsylvania
1856 establishments in Pennsylvania
Queen post truss bridges in the United States